The Arrows of Robin Hood (Strely  Robin Guda, alternative translations   Robin Good's Arrows, Robin Gud's Arrows) is a Soviet 1975 film about Robin Hood directed by Sergei Tarasov.

Two soundtracks exist for the film. In 1975 Vladimir Vysotsky wrote and performed seven ballads, six of them were included in the final version. However a recommendation by Goskino editorial board called them inadequate for a romantic adventure; the real reason being conflicts with Vysotsky. In 1976 new songs were performed by Aija Kukule and Viktors Lapčenoks, lyrics by Lev Prozorovsky, music by Raimonds Pauls, this version was released in the cinemas. Four of Vysotsky's songs were later used in 1982 film The Ballad of the Valiant Knight Ivanhoe also directed by Tarasov, set in the same time and place and using some of the same characters. In the 1990s the film was successfully re-released with the 1975 soundtrack. The DVDs also have the 1975 soundtrack.

Cast
 Boris Khmelnitsky as Robin Good (voiced by Alexander Belyavsky)
 Regīna Razuma as Maria
 Vija Artmane as Kat
 Eduards Pāvuls as Friar Tuck
 Hariy Shveiyts as Little John
 Algimantas Masyulis as Guy of Gisbourne
 Yuri Kamornyj as jester  
 Juris Strenga as Bishop Gerford
 Ints Burāns as  Sir Ralph, Sheriff of Nottingham
 Mirdza Martinsone as Lady Anna
 Yanis Plesums as Alan
 Mārtiņš Vērdiņš as Sir Edmond
 Nikolay Dupak as miller
 Ivars Kalniņš as episode

References

External links
 

Soviet adventure films
Robin Hood films
1975 films
1970s adventure films
1970s Russian-language films
Films based on works by Walter Scott
The Arrows
1975 in the Soviet Union
Riga Film Studio films